Johnstown may refer to:

Places

Australia
 Johnstown, Queensland, a locality split between the Southern Burnett Region and the Gympie Region, Queensland

Canada
 Johnstown, Nova Scotia
 Johnstown, Ontario, United Counties of Leeds and Grenville
 Johnstown, Hastings County, Ontario
 Johnstown District, Upper Canada

Ireland
Johnstown Castle, a Gothic Revival castle in County Wexford
Johnstown, Dublin
Johnstown, Kilcumny, a townland in Kilcumny civil parish, County Westmeath
Johnstown, County Kildare
Johnstown, County Kilkenny
Johnstown, Killulagh, a townland in Killulagh civil parish, County Westmeath
Monroe or Johnstown (Nugent), a townland in County Westmeath
Johnstown, Templeoran, a townland in the barony of Moygoish, County Westmeath
Johnstown, Killodiernan, a townland in North Tipperary
Johnstown, Navan, a townland near Navan County Meath

United States
 Johnstown, Colorado
 Johnstown, Illinois
 Johnstown, Indiana
 Johnstown, Kansas
 Johnstown, Maryland
 Johnstown, Missouri
 Johnstown, Nebraska, a village in Brown County
 Johnstown (city), New York
 Johnstown (town), New York
 Johnstown, North Dakota
 Johnstown, Ohio
 Johnstown, Pennsylvania, a city in Cambria County, Pennsylvania
 Johnstown (Amtrak station)
 Johnstown, West Virginia
 Johnstown, Wisconsin (disambiguation)  
 Johnstown, Wyoming
 Johnstown Township, Michigan
 Johnstown Township, Grand Forks County, North Dakota, Grand Forks County, North Dakota

Wales
Johnstown, Wrexham
Johnstown, Carmarthenshire

Other uses 
 Johnstown (crater), a crater on Mars
 Johnstown (horse), an American Hall of Fame racehorse
 Johnstown (meteorite), a 1924 meteorite which fell in Colorado, United States
 Johnstown, a name briefly given to the Apollo program tracking/commutations ship Redstone
 Johnstown, a 1999 album by Canadian musician Oh Susanna

See also 
 Johnstown Flood (disambiguation)
 Jonestown (disambiguation)
 Johnsontown (disambiguation)
 Johnston (disambiguation)
 Johntown (disambiguation)
 Saint Johnstown (disambiguation)